The Utter-Gerig Round Barn is a round barn located in Henry Township near Akron, Fulton County, Indiana.  It was built in 1915, and is a wood frame barn measuring approximately 63 feet in diameter.  It rests on a fieldstone foundation and has two primary floors. The second level is reached by a broad earth ramp.

It was listed on the National Register of Historic Places in 1990.

References

Barns on the National Register of Historic Places in Indiana
Buildings and structures in Fulton County, Indiana
Infrastructure completed in 1915
Round barns in Indiana
National Register of Historic Places in Fulton County, Indiana
1915 establishments in Indiana